The  is a scientific journal of plant taxonomy and botany. The journal was founded in April 1916 by Makino Tomitarō, who continued as editor until 1933. Makino was succeeded as chief editor by Asahina Yasuhiko (1933–1975), Hara Hiroshi (1975–1987),  (1987–2006), and Ōhashi Hiroyoshi (2006–). According to the International Plant Names Index, over 5,500 plant names have been first published in the journal.

References

External links

Botany journals
Publications established in 1916
Academic journals of Japan